Highland County is the name of two counties in the United States:

 Highland County, Ohio 
 Highland County, Virginia

See also
 Highlands County, Florida

fr:Highland#Comtés